

Long course (50 m)

Men

Women

Short course (25 m)

Men

Women

References 
Agendadiana.com, 

Italy